Mukura was an Indian Odia language magazine published from Cuttack. It was started in 1925 and run for 25 years. Brajasundar Das was the founding editor of the magazine. It ceased to publish after 1930.

Mukura played instrumental role in encouraging nationalistic literature. The intellectuals and writers of Satyabadi school started their literary career through Mukura.

References

Magazines established in 1905
Odia literature
Odia-language mass media
Mass media in Odisha
1925 establishments in British India